Gonepteryx mahaguru, the lesser brimstone, is a medium-sized butterfly of the family Pieridae, that is, the yellows and whites. It is native to the Kashmir, Uttarakhand, China, Korea, and Japan.

Relation to Gonepteryx aspasia
Though there has historically been confusion regarding whether G. mahaguru and G. aspasia are different species – exacerbated by the fact that Ménétriès's 1859 description of G. aspasia received widespread recognition while Gistel's earlier 1857 description of G. mahaguru was unknown to his contemporaries – they have since been determined to be different species.

See also
List of butterflies of India (Pieridae)

References

  
 
 
 

Gonepteryx
Butterflies of Asia
Butterflies described in 1857
Taxa named by Johannes von Nepomuk Franz Xaver Gistel